Han Peng may refer to:

Han Peng (footballer, born 1983), male footballer
Han Peng (footballer, born 1989), female footballer
Han Peng (curler)